Ergersheim may refer to:
Ergersheim, Middle Franconia, a town in Germany
Ergersheim, Bas-Rhin, a town in France